Arnold II is a Count of Boulogne identified by Morton and Muntz (page xxxi note 7) as the one slain in battle by Count Enguerrand I of Ponthieu. Frank Barlow (page xliii note 125) prefers to retain the traditional identification of the slain count as Baldwin I of Boulogne. However, he admits that the identification is "uncertain." In any case, the widow (Adelvie?) of Baldwin / Arnold then married Count Enguerrand I.

Sources
 The Carmen de Hastingae Proelio of Guy Bishop of Amiens, edited and translated by Frank Barlow, Clarendon Press, Oxford, 1999.
 The Carmen de Hastingae Proelio of Guy Bishop of Amiens, edited by Catherine Morton and Hope Muntz, Oxford at the Clarendon Press, 1972.

Counts of Boulogne